Black Sails is an American television drama series created by Jon Steinberg and Robert Levine for Starz that debuted on January 25, 2014. It was produced by Film Afrika Worldwide and Platinum Dunes. It was written as a prequel to Robert Louis Stevenson's novel Treasure Island. The series was renewed for a fourth season on July 31, 2015, approximately six months before the third season premiered. On July 20, 2016, Starz announced that the series' fourth season would be its last; the season premiered on January 29, 2017 and concluded on April 2, 2017.

Series overview

Episodes

Season 1 (2014)

Season 2 (2015)

Season 3 (2016)

Season 4 (2017)

References

External links
 
 
 

Lists of American drama television series episodes